Samuel or Sam Gates may refer to:

Samuel Gates, character in List of Person of Interest episodes
Samuel Gates (shipbuilder) of USS Ora (SP-75)
Sam Gates, character in Spy for a Day